Aslaug Fredriksen (born 9 November 1918 in Vestnes, died 3 February 2000) was a Norwegian politician for the Christian Democratic Party.

She was elected to the Norwegian Parliament from Møre og Romsdal in 1977, and was re-elected on one occasion. She had previously served as a deputy representative during the term 1973–1977.

On the local level she was a member of Sunndal municipal council from 1967 to 1977.

References

1918 births
2000 deaths
People from Vestnes
People from Sunndal
Members of the Storting
Møre og Romsdal politicians
Christian Democratic Party (Norway) politicians
20th-century Norwegian politicians